Farruca is a form of flamenco music developed in the late 19th century. Classified as a cante chico, it is traditionally sung and danced by men. Its origin is traditionally associated with Galicia, a region in northern Spain.

An instrumental adaptation of the farruca was developed by guitarist Ramón Montoya and flamenco dancer Faíco in the 20th century. Others who stylized and expanded farruca include Antonio de Bilbao, Manolito la Rosa and El Batato. Although there are female flamenco dancers who exclusively danced farruca too (such as Rafaela Valverde "La Tanguera"), these female dancers originally danced the farruca wearing male clothing. Women dancers such as Carmen Amaya and Sara Baras have also created well-known versions of the dance.

History 
Farruco is a way of calling the Franciscos and the Asturians in Andalusia. Farruco was also the name that people from Andalusia used to denominate people from Galicia, from where this song likely originates. In Flamenco, being mostly an oral tradition, the lyrics often give valuable hints about their origins, and Farruca lyrics undoubtedly allude to the Galicia region. Further proof can be established from the descending melody that is performed on the vowel 'a' at the end of each couplet and to close the "cante" (Spanish for song or singing), which in a certain way tends to imitate the Galician melos. Another feature of Farruca cante is the use of glossolalia, "con el tran-tran-tran-treiro", which is reminiscent of the Galician region. It has to be stressed, though, that to this day its geographic origin has not been proven scientifically.

Dance 
The original dance version is due to the Sevillian dancer Faíco who was accompanied by Ramón Montoya, who is said to have invented the typical farruca melody for the guitar. The success was thunderous and from then on many other dancers stylized and expanded this flamenco style, such as El Gato or Antonio Gades. Montoya's dance adaptation of the farruca is seldom sung. It is commonly played in the key of A minor, with each compás equivalent to 2 measures of 4/4 time with emphasis on the 1st, 3rd, 5th, and 7th beats: [1] 2 [3] 4 [5] 6 [7] 8

The dance often has fast turns, quick intense footwork, held lifts and falls, dramatic poses and bursts of filigrana (often with a flat hand). It can also be danced with a cape.

References

Bibliography 
 

Flamenco styles
Spanish dances